Abdullah Hayayei (4 December 1980 – 11 July 2017) was an Emirati athlete. He competed at the 2016 Summer Paralympics, finishing sixth in the javelin and seventh in the shot put.

Hayayei died in London at the Newham Leisure Centre, where he was training for the 2017 World Para Athletics Championships, on 11 July 2017 after a throwing cage fell on his head. He was survived by five children.

References

1980 births
2017 deaths
Paralympic athletes of the United Arab Emirates
Athletes (track and field) at the 2016 Summer Paralympics
Sport deaths in England
Emirati shot putters